Vola and the Oriental Machine (also known as Vola) is a four-member Japanese rock band formed by Number Girl and ex-Zazen Boys drummer Ahito Inazawa in 2005. The group is named after the soccer team Vola F.C., which was also the name of the short-lived band formed by Inazawa before Number Girl's disbandment in 2002.

History 
After parting ways with Zazen Boys due to creative differences in early 2005, drummer Ahito Inazawa formed Vola and the Oriental Machine. Inazawa, well known for his maniac drumming in Number Girl, Zazen Boys and numerous other projects, surprised the Japanese rock scene by ditching his drumsticks and taking the position of a frontman instead. He took on the moniker Vola and handles guitar and vocals in the band. Aoki Yutaka from downy joined him on the guitar, Nakahata Daiki from Syrup16g was recruited to handle the drums and Arie Yoshinori from Lost in Time on the bass guitar.

The band released their debut, a 7-track mini-album Waiting for My Food on January 25, 2006. The band's first full album Android: Like a House Mannequin was released April 11, 2007. The CD includes a remix of Yume Shindan produced by Polysics lead singer, Hiroyuki Hayashi. Music from the album was featured in a commercial for the popular japanese magazine, PS (Pretty Style).

Members

Current 
Ahito Inazawa (アヒト・イナザワ) Born on June 6, 1973, in Fukuoka, Japan.
Arie Yoshinori (有江嘉典) Born on December 25, 1969, in Fukuoka, Japan.
Daiki Nakahata (中畑大樹) Born on July 25, 1974, in Aomori, Japan.
Eisuke Narahara (楢原英介) Born on August 6, 1981 Chiba, Japan. Previously performing as a support member after Aoki Yutaka's departure, Narahara, joined the band as a full-time member on December 1, 2008.

Past 
Aoki Yutaka (青木裕) Born on January 29, 1970, in Ibaraki, Japan, died March 19, 2018. Withdrew from the band on September 30, 2008, in order to devote more time with instrumental rock band unkie. Post-rock band downy guitarist.

Discography

Albums 
[2006.01.25] Waiting for My Food (mini)
Principle of Machine
A Communication Refusal Desire
Concour
Nageri to Kasuppa
Yume Shindan
Fatal Incident (Please Take My Breath Away)
Song of Ruin

[2007.04.11] Android: Like a House Mannequin
Oriental Machine
Mexico Pub
Waiting for My Food
Hane no Hikari (album ver.)
Mind Control
Food's Next
Blue Song
Yume Shindan (Carte.......Nashi.......mix)
To-Ki-Me-I-Te Tonight flight
The Counterattack of the Dreamer (Yumemibito no Gyakushu)

[2008.10.08] Halan'na-ca Darkside (mini)
S.E.
Self-Defense
An Imitation's Superstar
深海における捕食行動考 (Interlude)
Soft Genocide
人造人間症候群 (Interlude)
Internal Division
X線技師の苦悩 (Interlude)
Double Standard

[2009.07.29] Sa-Ka-Na Electric Device
Oriental Melancholy
Turning Turning
Weekend Lovers
Dark Emperor
No Dream
In the Morning
The Sea of the Sand
A Sick Island
Dead or Dance!!
Kirakira Future days

[2010.09.22] Principle
The Empire of Vola
Thank You My Force
Risky the Stars
Magic Tantric Dancehall
Rough Consensus: 特定問題に関する「集団の感覚」
Flag
80s Man
Hello Darkness, My New World
Panic in the Tokyo
The Beginning of the Beginning

[2019.04.03] Transducer
Hangover & Volafc.Com
Mac-Roy
Rare Case a Windows
Perfect Yellow
Winter Ghost
Parallel lines
Last Dance

Singles 
[2006.10.25] Hane no Hikari
Hane no Hikari
Comeback in Darkness
Kamu Neko

[2009.06.17] 50/50
Weekend Lovers
Sweet Men

References

External links 
Vola and the Oriental Machine - Official website 
Vola and the Oriental Machine - Universal Japan 
Musicwhore.org Waiting for My Food review
Musicwhore.org Halan'na-ca Darkside review

Japanese rock music groups
Japanese new wave musical groups
Musical groups from Tokyo